Dancon March DANCON is short for Danish Contingent and the march has been a tradition with the Danish Defence since 1972 when the Royal Danish Army was deployed on Cyprus. The march invites foreign troops, allied with Denmark, to participate in the 25 or 40 km march. Apart from Cyprus, Dancon marches have taken place in Mongolia, Croatia, Kosovo, Iraq, Afghanistan, Lebanon, Eritrea, Kuwait, Bosnia, Mali and the Gulf of Aden, United Arab Emirates, The United States of America (USA) and Estonia

Quotes
"The purpose of the march is to demonstrate the physical preparedness of the army and as a social event." - Danish Staff Sgt. Morten Reher

External links
Let the March Begin
These boots are made for walking and so nearly 1,100 soldiers coming from all over Kosovo did in the traditional Danish Contingent (DANCON) march
Dancon March 
Kingdom of Denmark: DANCON March Medal
Rødt på jord, guld i vest, sort på himmel, guld i øst, grønt på dåse: 100 km Dancon Eritrea
https://web.archive.org/web/20100503174220/http://www.dancon-march.com/

Military history of Denmark